Rosalyn Waseka Nandwa (born 22 June 1968) is a Kenyan politician who is the current deputy chief of staff to the deputy president of Kenya William Ruto and chief of staff to the second lady Rachel Ruto.

Early life 
Rosalyn Waseka was born on 22 June 1968. She graduated from Nairobi University with a Bachelor of Laws degree. Following a successful stint in corporate law, she proceeded to start her own practice, Deche, Nandwa, Bryant. Following several years in private practice, she obtained an LLM in International Law from the University of Alabama Law School. She also has a doctorate in counselling and Ministry.

Ruto's Administration 
She joined the Ruto administration in April 2014 as the Deputy Chief of Staff for Deputy President William Ruto, succeeding Linnet Hamasi in this position.

Personal life
Nandwa is married to Harrison Nandwa, with whom she has four children, Eugene, Nicole, Natalie, and Ethan.

References

 

Living people
1968 births
University of Nairobi alumni
University of Alabama School of Law alumni